Frozen Music is an album by pianist Andy LaVerne recorded in 1989 and released on the Danish label, SteepleChase.

Reception 

Ken Dryden of AllMusic called it a "very rewarding studio date" and "One in a long line of great CDs by Andy LaVerne for Steeplechase".

Track listing 
All compositions by Andy LaVerne
 "Numero Uno" – 6:35
 "Nitewriter" – 8:53
 "It's Not My Problem" – 9:07
 "North Country" – 7:12 Bonus track on CD
 "Satan Doll" – 6:01 Bonus track on CD
 "Decorative Trends" – 6:38
 "The Bundo Credo" – 8:20
 "Frozen Music" – 3:24
 "Blue Cycle" – 7:06

Personnel 
Andy LaVerne – piano
Rick Margitza – tenor saxophone, soprano saxophone
Marc Johnson – bass
Danny Gottlieb – drums

References 

Andy LaVerne albums
1989 albums
SteepleChase Records albums